Čelebići is a village in the municipality of Konjic, Bosnia and Herzegovina.

Demographics

People
 Ilija Stanić, Yugoslav secret police agent

References

External links 
 

Populated places in Konjic